Samsung GT-i8910 Omnia HD is a smartphone manufactured by Samsung Electronics, first announced at MWC 2009 on February 18, 2009. The device was the first phone capable of playing and recording 720p HD video. It runs on the S60 5th Edition (Symbian^1) platform, the only Samsung device to do so.

Features and capabilities
The HD comes in two versions: with 8 or 16 GB of integrated storage, both having a hot-swappable microSD card slot handling up to 32 GB. The i8910 HD is a quad-band GSM/GPRS/EDGE handset with tri-band UMTS support, HSDPA (up to 7.2 Mbit/s) and HSUPA (up to 5.76 Mbit/s) support. The Australian release supports the UMTS 2100/900Mhz frequency band, making it dual band UMTS and operational on Optus' 'yes G' dual band network but not on Telstra's 'Next G' network, as that operates on the UMTS 850Mhz band only. In this instance the GSM network would be used (slower speeds, no video calls, etc.).

3.7-inch capacitive touchscreen
This handset comes with a 3.7-inch AMOLED capacitive touchscreen (instead of Resistive) having a resolution of 640 x 360 pixels, capable of displaying up to 16 million colors.(instead of LCD(16:9 aspect ratio)

8.1-megapixel camera with LED flash
It has an 8-megapixel camera with the industry-first 720p HD video recording at 24 frame/s. Other imaging assets include geotagging, face detection, smile detection and WDR (Wide Dynamic Range) setting. The i8910 HD runs on Symbian (on Symbian s60 5th edition), with Samsung's TouchWiz interface.** 
The camera at normal settings clicks photos at 4:3 aspect ratio. But can also click at 16:9 aspect ratio by downscaling to 6-megapixel (w6m).

Connectivity
The device offers Wi-Fi with DLNA, Bluetooth 2.0 with A2DP, a standard microUSB port, a 3.5 mm audio jack and TV-out. A GPS receiver with S-GPS+Xtragps is included, along with the optional Samsung Mobile Navigator by Route 66.

Other features
 DivX/XviD, MPEG4 support, subtitles support
 HD (720p) output to compatible televisions via DLNA technology
 S60 5th edition
 Accelerometer for screen auto rotate and turn-to-mute
 Proximity sensor for auto screen turn-off
 Magnetometer for digital compass
 GPS receiver with A-GPS
 FM radio with RDS
 Virtual 5.1 channel surround (on headphones)
 Web browser with Flash video support
 Office document viewer

Windows Phone
Although this device is not based on either Windows Mobile or Windows Phone, in 2010, Microsoft successfully made a modification on this device to be able to run Windows Phone just before the official debut of Samsung's first Windows Phone smartphone, Omnia 7.
(The Windows Phone operating system can't run on the Omnia HD's original OMAP3 processor, as the WP7 handset had a Snapdragon-based processor.)

See also
OMAP
Samsung i900 Omnia
Samsung i8000 Omnia II
Samsung i8510 Innov8
Sony Ericsson Satio
Nokia N97
HTC Hero
iPhone 3GS
Palm Pre

References

External links
 Samsung OmniaHD - Samsung Official Website
 Biggest Help and Modding Forum for Samsung i8910

I900
Samsung smartphones
Symbian devices
Portable media players
Mobile phones introduced in 2009
Discontinued smartphones
Mobile phones with user-replaceable battery